Elba Island is an island in the Detroit River. It is in Wayne County, in southeast Michigan. Numerous types of fish spawn at the island, including northern pike, goldfish, carp, minnow, channel catfish, bullhead catfish, white bass, and white crappie.

References

Islands of Wayne County, Michigan
Islands of the Detroit River
River islands of Michigan
Michigan populated places on the Detroit River